José Marajo (born 10 August 1954 in Paris) is a former middle distance runner from France. He set his personal best (3:34.93) in the men's 1500 metres in 1983.

International competitions

References

1954 births
Living people
Athletes from Paris
French male middle-distance runners
Olympic athletes of France
Athletes (track and field) at the 1976 Summer Olympics
Athletes (track and field) at the 1980 Summer Olympics
World Athletics Championships athletes for France
Universiade medalists in athletics (track and field)
Mediterranean Games gold medalists for France
Mediterranean Games medalists in athletics
Athletes (track and field) at the 1979 Mediterranean Games
Universiade bronze medalists for France
Medalists at the 1977 Summer Universiade
20th-century French people
21st-century French people